The 2013–14 Liga Națională was the 56th season of Romanian Women's Handball League, the top-level women's professional handball league. The league comprises twelve teams. Oltchim Râmnicu Vâlcea were the defending champions, for the seventh season in a row, but the team was dissolved during the summer of 2013.

Teams for 2013–14 

CSM București
HCM Baia Mare
Corona Braşov
SCM Craiova
Dunărea Brăila
HCM Râmnicu Vâlcea
Cetate Deva
CSM Ploieşti
HCM Roman
Universitatea Cluj-Napoca
HC Zalău
Neptun Constanţa

Standings 

1. * CSM București was docked 1 point.

2. ** SCM Craiova was docked 2 points.

Play-off

Play-out

League table – positions 1–3

League table – positions 4–6

League table – positions 7–9

League table – positions 10–12

Top goalscorers

Liga Națională (women's handball)
2013 in Romanian women's sport
2014 in Romanian women's sport
2013–14 domestic handball leagues